Hector "Pat" O'Hara Wood (30 April 1891 – 3 December 1961) was an Australian tennis player.

O'Hara Wood was born in St Kilda, a suburb of Melbourne, Victoria. He is best known for his two victories at the Australasian Championships (now the Australian Open) in 1920 and 1923. Pat was quick around the court, had textbook groundstrokes, sharp volleys and a solid serve. He died in 1961, aged seventy in Richmond, Australia. His brother Arthur O'Hara Wood (1890–1918) was also an Australian tennis player and won the 1914 Australasian Championships.

After attending Melbourne Grammar School, he entered Trinity College (University of Melbourne) in 1911, where he excelled at cricket as well as tennis, leading the Trinity College team to a memorable victory against Ormond College in March 1911, where he made 167 not out. In 1916, as a 23-year-old law student, he enlisted as an officer in the Australian Army.  In 1919, as Captain Pat O'Hara-Wood, he and Bombardier Randolph Lycett won the doubles event at the Inter-Allied Games in Paris.

On 3 August 1923 he married Australian tennis player Meryl Waxman.

Grand Slams finals

Singles: 2 titles

Doubles: 11 (5 titles, 6 runners-up)

Mixed Doubles: 1 title

References

External links
 ADB biography
 
 
 

1891 births
1961 deaths
Australasian Championships (tennis) champions
Australian male tennis players
Tennis players from Melbourne
Wimbledon champions (pre-Open Era)
People educated at Melbourne Grammar School
People educated at Trinity College (University of Melbourne)
Grand Slam (tennis) champions in men's singles
Grand Slam (tennis) champions in mixed doubles
Grand Slam (tennis) champions in men's doubles
People from St Kilda, Victoria